Bryant William Bowles Jr. (March 1920 in Alford, Florida – April 13, 1997 in Tampa, Florida) was a white supremacist bitterly opposed to racial integration of public schools in the United States.

Bowles joined the Marine Corps in 1939, was trained as a bugler, and served during World War II and the Korean War as a corporal. He was discharged from active duty in 1951.

In May 1954, the U.S. Supreme Court ruled that racially segregated public schools were unconstitutional. Bowles raised $6,000 and founded the National Association for the Advancement of White People to oppose the ruling.

During the latter half of 1954, Bowles held rallies and gave speeches in several different states. At one such rally Bowles is reported to have said that his daughter "will never attend a school with Negroes as long as there is breath in my body and gunpowder will burn." He briefly attracted nationwide attention for leading a pro-segregation boycott of Milford High School in Milford, Delaware. The ensuing unrest, which included cross burnings, contributed to desegregation in most of Southern Delaware being delayed for another ten years.

Charged for making inflammatory statements, Bowles was tried in 1955 in Dover before Judge Charles Sudler Richards. After brief deliberation the jury found Bowles not guilty. A 1999 article in Delaware Lawyer states that "many years later it was learned that one of the jurors was a member of Bowles' organization."

In 1958, while living near Beaumont, Texas, Bowles shot and killed his brother-in-law following a family argument. According to Texas Department of Criminal Justice records, he was sentenced to a life term for premeditated murder but was paroled in March 1973. In 1994, Bowles returned to prison in Texas for a year for having violated the terms of his parole.

Bowles died at age 77 of congestive heart failure in Tampa, two years after gaining parole a second time. He was buried in Florida National Cemetery in Bushnell, Florida.

References
 Hartnett, Maurice A., III. The Delaware Judiciary in the 20th Century. Delaware Lawyer (Delaware Bar Foundation), Winter 1999/2000, Vol. 17, No. 4. PDF file
 Lardner, Richard; and Stanley, Doug. Killers among Heroes. The Tampa Tribune, December 11, 2005. Cached copy This is the main source for biographical details in this article. Note that the original link to Tampa Tribune website is no longer valid.
 Willoughby, B. (2004). The United States, circa 1954. Teaching Tolerance, (25), 47. Cited by Terhune, Carol in "From Desegregation to Diversity: How Far Have We Really Come?", Journal of Nursing Education, May 2004, Vol. 43, No. 5. Second source for the "gunpowder" quotation. 

1920 births
1997 deaths
People from Jackson County, Florida
American people convicted of murder
American segregationists
American white supremacists
People convicted of murder by Texas
Prisoners sentenced to life imprisonment by Texas
American prisoners sentenced to life imprisonment
People paroled from life sentence
United States Marine Corps personnel of World War II
United States Marine Corps personnel of the Korean War